The name USS Argonaut may refer to the following submarines of the United States Navy:

 , commissioned in 1925 and lost in 1943 during World War II
 , a  commissioned in 1945 that served during World War II and was sold to Canada in 1968, becoming

See also
 

United States Navy ship names